Bonabes is a surname. Notable people with the surname include:

Alexis Bonabes, Marquess of Rougé Peer of France, (1778–1839), French military officer and statesman
Bonabes, Count of Rougé (1891–1975), Secretary General of the Red Cross from 1936 to 1957
Bonabes, Marquess of Rougé (1751–1783), French colonel, third Marquis de Rougé
Bonabes IV de Rougé de Derval (1328–1377), knight from the House of Rougé, ambassador of the King of France in England

See also
Bon Abbas